NewSong is an American contemporary Christian music group that was founded in 1981, at Morningside Baptist Church in Valdosta, Georgia. They have had twelve GMA Dove Award nominations, and one Grammy Award Nomination. 

They are also the founders of the Winter Jam Tour Spectacular, the United States' largest annual Christian music tour. It began in 1995, and is hosted by NewSong. Winter Jam has had many of the most popular Contemporary artists perform each year, including TobyMac, Hillsong UNITED, Newsboys, Lecrae, MercyMe, and Skillet.

NewSong has frequently provided support for organizations working with abandoned and underprivileged children. For years they worked with World Vision, a humanitarian organization dedicated to working with children, families and their community to rid them of poverty and injustice. Then in 2006, the band became involved with Holt International, a world leader in child adoption and child welfare.

The original four members included the current members Eddie Carswell, Billy Goodwin, and former members Eddie Middleton and Bobby Apon.

History

1981–1993

NewSong recorded three custom albums independently. In 1982, they signed on with Covenant Records, and released The Son In My Eyes the next year. In 1984, they signed a contract with Canaan Records, a branch of CCM label giant Word Records and released The Word. NewSong continued to stay with Word Records until 1991 when they signed on with DaySpring Records. The next year they released One Heart At A Time, The Best of NewSong, which featured 12 hits from their previous albums. In 1993, they joined up with the Benson Music Group and released All Around The World, which brought four No. 1 hits. In 1993, lead vocalist Eddie Middleton left to pursue a solo career, and Bobby Apon left to spend more time with his family.

1994–1999

In 1994, songwriter Leonard Ahlstrom, soloist Charles Billingsley, musician Scotty Wilbanks, and the lead vocalist from the contemporary Christian band Truth, Russ Lee, joined NewSong. That year NewSong released People Get Ready which brought four No. 1 hits, and featured a re-recorded version of "Arise My Love", which was first recorded by the original group in 1987.

In 1996, Charles Billingsley left to pursue a solo career. In 1997, NewSong released Love Revolution. It featured four No. 1 hits, including "Miracles," which stayed at No.1 on the CCM Adult Contemporary chart for four consecutive weeks, tying the record set a few years earlier by Bob Carlisle's "Butterfly Kisses".

In May 1999, Bobby Apon died. He was recognized on the album Arise, My Love, The Very Best of NewSong. This featured 12 of their previous No. 1 hits. It also included two new songs which became No. 1 hits, "Can’t Keep A Good Man Down", and "Jesus To The World (Roaring Lambs)", which was inspired by Christian speaker and author Bob Briner, who died later that year from cancer. They also had a third new song, "Like Minded, Like Hearted", which NewSong recorded with Out of Eden of Gotee Records.

2000–2002

Russ Lee and Scotty Wilbanks left NewSong in 2000. They were replaced by soloist Michael O’Brien, Steve Reischl, and former Truth member, Matt Butler. Songwriter and electric guitarist Leonard Ahlstrom also left later to help a friend manage a recording label in Florida.

Leading up to 2000, NewSong caught the attention of popular radio personality, DC Daniel (then, of "Steve & DC") and began collaborating on production ideas for future projects. The partnership led to the most successful period of NewSong's career as they released the album Sheltering Tree, in late 2000.

"Christmas Shoes" and breakthrough 
DC, Eddie Carswell and Leonard Ahlstrom penned the bonus track "The Christmas Shoes" for Sheltering Tree, which became a No. 1 mainstream radio hit in a Billboard chart-record three weeks, topping Billboards Adult Contemporary Chart.

Shortly after "The Christmas Shoes" became a No. 1 song, Clive Calder shut down the Benson label.  However due to the huge career momentum coming off 2000/2001, NewSong stayed with Zomba Music, on the major Reunion label, and released a full studio Christmas album, The Christmas Shoes, which was nominated in 2003 for a Grammy Award for Best Pop/Contemporary Gospel Album. Along with the title track, the album featured a variety of original Christmas tunes and Christmas classics “O Holy Night”.

The song's success also inspired Christian author Donna VanLiere to write a book based on the song. The book, which contained accounts of friendship from artists, singers, and speakers, won a Silver Angel Award. The book was on the New York Times Bestseller List in 2002. 

The book was later made into a TV movie for CBS, called The Christmas Shoes, starring Rob Lowe and Kimberly Williams-Paisley, which was released on December 1, 2002. It had nearly 17 million viewers and was the second highest-rated TV movie of the 2002–2003 seasons.

2003–2008

In 2003, Donna VanLiere released The Christmas Blessing, the second book in the series spawned by "The Christmas Shoes" song. It was a New York Times bestselling book, and was later made into a TV movie by CBS. It was the most watched TV movie in 2005, and had an appearance by NewSong, which showed them singing their holiday single "The Christmas Blessing". NewSong also received a Dove Award for Musical of the Year for The Christmas Shoes Musical.

In March 2004, NewSong announced that they were leaving Reunion Records and moving to Integrity Music. In November 2004, NewSong recorded their live worship album and DVD, Rescue: Live Worship at First Baptist Church of Woodstock, which is the home church for several members in the band.

The album was released in May 2005, and the DVD of the concert came out in September. In November, Scotty Wilbanks left to join the group Third Day, and to produce bands. Also in 2005, NewSong was inducted into the Georgia Music Hall of Fame.

In March 2006, Michael O’Brien left to restart his solo career and Drew Cline was asked to fill in. In September, Eddie Carswell, Matt Butler, Billy Goodwin, and guest artist Drew Cline released The Christmas Hope, featuring traditional Christmas carols, NewSong originals, and three songs to complement the book trilogy by Donna VanLiere. In November, The Christmas Shoes movie was released on DVD. The Christmas Hope, the third TV movie installment of the trilogy, was released in December 2008 by CBS.

The 2007 edition of the Winter Jam Tour Spectacular, which they founded in 1995, featured headliners Steven Curtis Chapman and Jeremy Camp, with special guests Hawk Nelson, Sanctus Real, new artist Britt Nicole, Speaker Tony Nolan, Presidential impersonator and comedian John Morgan and was attended by over 275,000 people and 37,000 made decisions for Christ. In March 2007, Christian solo artist Nate Sallie joined NewSong. In April, The Christmas Hope album was nominated for a Dove Award, for Best Christmas Album of the Year.

The 2008 Winter Jam Tour Spectacular concluded its 34-city run with a bang and a near sold-out crowd at the Sommet Center in Nashville and ranked No. 4 among the Top 100 Tours logged by Pollstar over the first 90 days of this year. Winter Jam 2008 had a 16 percent increase to 311, 836 fans coming to see MercyMe, Skillet, BarlowGirl, NewSong, and American Idol's Mandisa.

On December 29, 2008 in an email to subscribers of his newsletter, Russ Lee announced that he will be rejoining NewSong as lead vocalist.

Discography

Albums

Singles

References

External links
 

American Christian musical groups
Musical groups from Georgia (U.S. state)
Musical groups established in 1981
Word Records artists
Reunion Records artists